Jabet Peak is a peak in the Comer Range,  high, which marks the southwestern end of the serrate ridge  northeast of Port Lockroy, Wiencke Island, in the Palmer Archipelago, Antarctica. It was probably first sighted in 1898 by the Belgian Antarctic Expedition under Gerlache, and was first charted by the French Antarctic Expedition, 1903–05, under Jean-Baptiste Charcot, who named it for Jacques Jabet, boatswain of the expedition ship Français.

References

Mountains of the Palmer Archipelago